The "White Huns", also known as the White Hunas, in Iranian as the Spet Xyon and in Sanskrit as the Sveta-huna, were a sub-group of the Huna and/or Xionites. The White Huns are sometimes regarded as synonymous with the Hephthalites, but may have included other tribes as well. They are well known for their conquest and occupation of North India, particularly the Punjab region.

History 
The "White Huns," or Hephthalites, were reported by Byzantine, Indian, Chinese, Arab-Persian, Armenian and other written sources. Despite the abundance of information, a number of questions of the history of the states created by the Hephthalites are considered by scientists from different and often opposite points of view. Well-informed authors of Chinese chronicles call the regions of East Turkestan (Turfan) the homeland of the Hephthalites. According to this information, the eftalnts were driven out of there as a result of clashes with the neighboring tribes of the Juan-Juan. Hephthalites were divided into two groups - white huns and red huns. The latter owe their name to red headdresses, red armor and a red banner. It is still unclear whether these groups were different tribes that were part of the confederation, or whether they were some ethnic varieties that were part of a single tribal union. The Hephthalites were an Iranian-speaking people. Their language belonged to the East Iranian group, but was somewhat different from the language of other Iranian-speaking peoples. In the Tocharistan possessions, the official state language of the Hephthalites was Bactrian. Bactrian titles are read in the legends of the Hephthalite coins. Hephtalites writing developed on the basis of the Kushan. Few monuments of Hephthalite writing have survived. These include an inscription on a shard from Zangtepe, graffiti from Karzdepe, inscriptions from Afrasiab.

Latin and Syrian sources called the Chionites, Kidarites (Kushans) and Hephthalites as White Huns. They also included the Cadusii living in Nusaybin. Considering the identity of the Caspians with the Cadusii, the Nusaybin Cadusii, as well as the Chionites and Hephthalites, can be considered the successors of the Hyrcanian Cadusii or Caspians .. ", Which corresponds to" Alans and Sarir "or" Alans and Rus "in Munajim-bashy. Thus, the “Caucasian Huns”, who are not confused with the Huns and are identified with “Maskut” or “Massa-Huns”, can be correlated with the Hyrcanians, who were related to the military-trade colonies in the Caucasus.

The Hephthalite tribes are noted in Central Asia, mainly in the Trans-Caspian and in the upper reaches of the Amu Darya, by Arab and Persian-speaking authors under the name Haital (Tabari, Masudi, Ferdowsi, etc.).  Armenian historians are repeatedly mentioned Hephtalites , transcribing their name Idalyan, Idal or Haital. Vardapet has the term Haylan. Ghazar Parpetsi (end of the 5th century) Uses the term Heptal for their designation; Michael of Syria (IX century) - Tedal and Tedaltzi. Markwart also noted the Armenian term katisk - Cadusii, as one of the names of the Hephthalites.

It is necessary to point out that Markwart also associates with the White Huns the many times remembered Cadiseni - "Katisk" of Armenian sources. These Cadusii, or Cadiseni, occupied the Persian province of Herat. Initially, Markwart doubted whether to consider them Chionites or Hephthalites, but in his work he considered them Hephthalites. The Syrian writer Isaac of Antioch, writing about 400, says that the qudishaye is near Nusaybin. Nöldeke considered them to be relatives of the Kurds, with whom, in his opinion, they had many similarities. In the surviving fragments of John of Antioch, there is an indication that the Cadusii were counted among the Huns. This evidence suggests that the Cadusii inherited from the White Huns.

See also
 Huns
 Red Huns
 Jats

References

Ancient peoples of India
Ancient peoples of Pakistan
Hephthalites
Historical Iranian peoples
Nomadic groups in Eurasia
Huns
Cadusii